Christine Davy MBE (born 7 August 1934) is a former Australian alpine skier who competed at the 1956 and 1960 Winter Olympics.

Early life
Davy was born in Sydney to Ashleigh Osborne Davy and Elizabeth Deuchar (née Gordon) of Edgecliff, New South Wales. Her father was an ear, nose and throat surgeon who received the MVO for his services to the Prince Henry, Duke of Gloucester, and his family, whilst he was Governor General of Australia. Her mother was the daughter of William Deuchar Gordon of Manar, near Braidwood, New South Wales. Davy was educated at Frensham School.

Olympic record
In 1956, she came 39th, 33rd and 37th in the downhill, giant slalom and slalom respectively, out of 47, 48 and 49 entrants. In 1960, she came 27th, 32nd and 29th in the same three events, out of 46, 45 and 44 competitors.

Pilot
After retiring from skiing, she became a pioneering female airline pilot flying the DC-3 and the Fokker Friendship with Connellan Airways out of Alice Springs. She was the first Australian woman to hold a 1st Class Air Transport Pilot's Licence. In 1963, Davy received the Nancy Bird Trophy for her service to aviation from the Australian Women Pilots' Association. In 1974, Christine Davy, MBE, became the first woman in Australia to be employed as a pilot of a passenger airline, Connair, which was based in Alice Springs NT.

Honours
  Member of the Order of the British Empire — Awarded 1 January 1970 in recognition of her service to civil aviation.

References 

Olympic alpine skiers of Australia
Alpine skiers at the 1956 Winter Olympics
Living people
1934 births
Australian female alpine skiers
Australian aviators
Alpine skiers at the 1960 Winter Olympics
Australian women aviators
Commercial aviators
Australian women commercial aviators
People educated at Frensham School